Coast is a BBC documentary series first broadcast on BBC Two television in 2005. It covers various subjects relating to both the natural and social history of the British coastline and also more recently, that of Britain's near neighbours. The seventh series followed a different format from previous series. In 2016, reports from the show were repackaged as Coast: The Great Guide (known as Coast Great Guides when broadcast on BBC Four in 2021), an eight part series on BBC Two.

The series is a collaboration between the Open University and BBC Productions, Birmingham. It is also known as the placeholder programme when BBC2 is under a fault in programming.

In December 2013, the first reversion of the series format, Coast Australia, was screened on The History Channel in Australia. Hosted by Neil Oliver, it was the second highest-rated show in the history of the channel. It started airing on BBC Two from 14 May 2014; series 2 was aired in 2015. Coast New Zealand aired in 2016. A similar show, Arfordir Cymru (Wales Coast), is broadcast on the Welsh-language broadcaster S4C and hosted by Bedwyr Rees; three series have aired so far, each of six 23-minute-long episodes, travelling in Pembrokeshire (2014), the Llŷn Peninsula (2015), and Cardigan Bay (2017).

In 2020, BBC Studios produced a refresh of the original series called Our Coast, presented by Adrian Chiles and Mehreen Baig. The new series featured Dumfries and Galloway/South Ayrshire, County Down, Anglesey, and Liverpool.

Presenters

The original presenters, and their fields of interest, are:
Nicholas Crane (lead presenter, series 1, 6–) — geography
Neil Oliver (lead presenter, series 2–5) — archaeology and social history
Alice Roberts — anthropology and geology
Mark Horton — marine archaeology
Miranda Krestovnikoff — zoology
The original presenters have formed the backbone of the presenting team; however Alice Roberts left the Coast team after the end of the sixth series.

Several other presenters have also become regulars after originally appearing on a one-off basis:
Dick Strawbridge (series 2–) — engineering
Hermione Cockburn (series 2–) — general
Tessa Dunlop (series 6–) — social history
Adam Henson (series 6) — farming
Andy Torbet (series 7–) — general
Ruth Goodman (series 7–) — social history
Ian McMillan (series 7–) — general

Series overview

Series 1 started at the White Cliffs of Dover and progressed in a clockwise fashion around the coast of Great Britain (with a side trip to Northern Ireland). Series 2 again started at Dover but subsequent episodes did not follow series one in circumnavigating the UK coast, instead featuring various locations, including sections of the coast of the Republic of Ireland. Series 4 reintroduced the circular element, starting at Whitstable and ending at Hull, though with visits to Ireland, Normandy, and Norway included as well. The format of the seventh series abandoned the geographical element and instead each episode focused on a particular theme and featured locations from around the British Isles.
All but one of the episodes in the first series ended with Nicholas Crane stating that in the British Isles, "Remember, you are never more than 72 miles from the sea!" Neil Oliver closed the fifth series with the same statement.

Series 4 onwards were simulcast on the BBC HD channel.

Extracts from the programme are often used as filler items on BBC Two, for example following a fifty-minute documentary programme such as Natural World or Horizon, to allow the next full programme to begin on the hour. As the aerial shots from the Coast programmes are made in high-definition, they are also used in this way on BBC HD.

Episodes from old series have been shown on Yesterday.

Series 5 was shown overseas (e.g. in New Zealand on the Living Channel) before being shown on the BBC.

DVD releases

Series 1 to 5 of Coast have been released on Region 2 DVD by Contender Home Entertainment, or, following their acquisition, by E1 Entertainment. Series 6 onwards have been released on Region 2 DVD and Region B Blu-ray by Acorn Media UK.

Numerous box sets have been released, including one which packaged Series 1 with another BBC documentary, A Picture of Britain.

Series 1 (2005)

The first series of Coast was originally aired on BBC2 during the summer of 2005. The series follows a circumnavigation of the coastline, starting and finishing in Dover.

Lead presenter Nicholas Crane remarks on more than one occasion during the series that it was a "once-in-a-lifetime journey" suggesting that Coast was originally planned as a one-off series, although subsequent series did not follow the same "journey round the coast of Britain" approach, but concentrated on stories from various areas, including overseas. Series 1 is the only series yet to include more than eight episodes. A review episode was shown on 2 September 2005, looking back over the series' highlights, and looking at the future of the coastline – this is not included in the DVD release for the series.

Series 2 (2006)

The second series of Coast was originally aired on BBC2 during the autumn of 2006. Whilst the series starts in Dover and finishes in nearby Margate, it does not follow same circular journey of the previous series. It is the first series to feature a foreign shoreline, that of the Republic of Ireland.

The subtitle of the series is The Journey Continues.

Series 3 (2007)

The third series of Coast was originally aired on BBC2 during the summer of 2007. In common with the previous series, the journey does not follow a circular course; the series starts in Shetland and finishes in Dover.

The subtitle of the series is A Journey of Discovery.

Series 4 (2009)

The fourth series of Coast was originally aired on BBC2 during the summer of 2009. It was simulcast on BBC HD for the first time. The series visits foreign shores for the second time: along with a return to Ireland, France, the Faroe Islands, and Norway are all included due to the fact they share a connection to the UK coastline. The circular element of the journey, last seen in the first series, returns; starting in Whitstable and finishing in Hull.

Unlike the last two series, there is no series subtitle, however the series was renamed to Coast and Beyond — helping to signify that the journey takes in coastlines outside the British Isles.

Series 5 (2010)

The fifth series of Coast was originally aired on BBC2 during the summer of 2010. It was simulcast on BBC HD. The series visits both France (for the second time) and Denmark (for the first time) exploring how these countries are linked to our own via the sea.  The series opens with a journey around the Irish Sea centred on the Isle of Man; in the remaining episodes a rough circumnavigation is completed from Swanage to London.

As with the previous series, the name Coast and Beyond is retained – helping to signify that the journey takes in coastlines outside the British Isles.

Series 6 (2011)

The sixth series of Coast was originally aired on BBC2 during the summer of 2011. It was simulcast on BBC HD. The series visits Belgium, the Netherlands, and Sweden (all for the first time) exploring how these countries are linked to our own via the sea.  The series does not follow a circular course, beginning in London and ending in Sweden.

As with the previous two series', the name Coast and Beyond is retained – helping to signify that the journey takes in coastlines outside the British Isles.

Series 7 (2012)

The seventh series of Coast was originally aired on BBC2 during the early summer of 2012. It was simulcast on BBC HD. The format of the series changed significantly from previous series in that each episode has a theme featuring stories from every part of the British Isles instead of concentrating on one geographical area per episode.

In keeping with this change in format, the name Coast and Beyond has been dropped in favour of the original Coast. To further enforce this each episodes starts with a short introduction monologue from Nicholas Crane which begins with the statement that "Coast is home".

The seventh series was the first series not to feature Alice Roberts, one of the original presenters.

Series 8 (2013)

The eighth series of Coast was broadcast starting 3 April on BBC2. It was simulcast on BBC HD. The series continued in the style started with the seventh series: each episode had a theme featuring stories from every part of the British Isles instead of concentrating on one geographical area per episode.

Series 9 (2014)

The ninth series of Coast was broadcast from 15 July 2014 on BBC Two. The series takes a journey around the British Isles and beyond, visiting France (again) and North America (for the first time) uncovering different stories along the way.

Series 10 (2015) 
The first episode was broadcast on 9 July 2015 on BBC Two and BBC Two HD.

Coast: The Great Guide (2016) 
This eight part series for BBC Two features reports from previous series of Coast (with clips from early reports used as part of the Flying Visit feature) linked by new footage of Neil Oliver and Tessa Dunlop undertaking trips in various forms of sea transport (for example Dunlop on a tugboat, as well as on a cruise across the sea in episode 8: Our Irish Sea Coast).

Coast Australia

Coast Australia is a continuation of the Coast series, this time traveling to and exploring the coast of Australia. The show is presented by Neil Oliver who is joined by local Australian experts. The first series of 8 episodes was commissioned by Australian pay-TV provider Foxtel as a joint production with the BBC.

It was first shown on The History Channel in Australia from 2 December 2013, becoming the channel's second highest-rated show ever, and later aired in Britain on BBC Two from 14 May 2014.

A second series was commissioned and began airing in Australia on 12 January 2015, and on 2 April in Britain.

A third series commenced production in early 2016 and was aired between 9 January 2017 and 27 February 2017.

Presenters
The main presenters and their fields of expertise are:
Neil Oliver (lead presenter) — geography
Tim Flannery - paleontology
Emma Johnston - marine ecology (not 2.05)
Brendan Moar - geography and social history (not 1.07, 2.05)
Xanthé Mallett - anthropology (not 2.01-2.02, 2.06-2.08)
Miriam Corowa - social evolution (Series 1)
Alice Garner - history (Series 2)

Series overview
Following the same format as the UK version, the show explores the Australian Coastline in sections, detailing both the natural and social history.

To introduce the series to as wide an audience as possible, the first series focused on well known and iconic Australian locations. These included the Great Barrier Reef, the Gold Coast, The Kimberley, Botany Bay, and Victoria's Shipwreck Coast. The series mixed the geological history of the Australian continent with modern post-European settlement of Australia.

After the success of the first series, the second series began to explore more unique locations like Norfolk Island, Torres Strait, and the Gippsland Lakes. It also took in more Aboriginal history, as well as visiting South Australia for the first time.

Series 1 (2013)
The first series of Coast Australia aired on 2 December 2013 on the History Channel in Australia and on 14 May 2014 on BBC Two. Comprising 8 episodes, the series looked at iconic landmarks throughout Australia like the Great Barrier Reef, Botany Bay, and the Gold Coast.

Series 2 (2015)
The second series of Coast Australia aired on 12 January 2015 on the History Channel in Australia and on 2 April 2015 on BBC Two. After the success of the first series exploring more familiar areas, the second series began to investigate lesser known sections of Australia including Norfolk Island and the Gippsland Lakes.

Series 3 (2017)
The third series of Coast Australia aired on 9 January 2017 until 27 March 2017. The series covered 8 episodes, and visited a variety of locations around Australia, including Lord Howe Island, the Bass Strait Islands, and the North Kimberley.

Coast New Zealand

Coast New Zealand is a continuation of the Coast series, this time showcasing and exploring the coastlines of Aotearoa, New Zealand.

The show is presented by Neil Oliver who is joined by several local New Zealand experts.

The first and second series of 6 episodes was commissioned by TVNZ in a joint production with the BBC and Great Southern Television.

Presenters
The main presenters and their fields of expertise are:
Neil Oliver (lead presenter) — geography (Series 1 & 2)
Matt Carter - maritime archaeologist (Series 2)
Hamish Campbell - geologist and palaeontologist (Series 2)
Jacky Geurts - marine biologist (Series 2)
Riria Hotere - author (Series 2)

Series 1 (2016)

The first series of Coast New Zealand aired on 19 April 2016 on TVNZ On Demand in New Zealand.

Comprising 6 episodes, the series consists of three episodes on each of New Zealand's main islands.

Series 2 (2017)

The second series of Coast New Zealand aired on 24 April 2017 on TVNZ in New Zealand.

Comprising 6 episodes, Scottish historian, archaeologist, author, and broadcaster Neil Oliver returns to explore the panoramic beauty and history of New Zealand's coastlines.

Series 3 (2018)

The third series of Coast New Zealand began airing on 22 April 2018 on TVNZ in New Zealand.

Comprising 6 episodes, Scottish historian, archaeologist, author, and broadcaster Neil Oliver returns to explore the panoramic beauty and history of New Zealand's coastlines.

Footnotes
 This closing narration was part of a promotion for the tie-in BBC-sponsored walks and accompanying booklet, and was removed from many of the repeat showings.
 Series 1 Episode 13 was broadcast as a series' highlight programme which also looking at the future of the coastline. The episode is not included in the DVD release for the series.
 First mentioned in the introduction of Series 1 Episode 1.
 The credit for "Additional Writing by..." only appears on episodes shown in Series 1.
 Series 6 Episode 2 was broadcast the week after Episode 3 due to over-running coverage of the 2011 Canadian Grand Prix.
 Due to the revised format of Series 7 each episode is credited to various directors.

References

General References

External links
 
Open2.net - Coast
Coast - IMDB
www.alice-roberts.co.uk

2005 British television series debuts
2000s British documentary television series
2010s British documentary television series
BBC television documentaries
Television series by BBC Studios
Open University